Charles Utter Deaton (January 1, 1921 – December 18, 1996) was an American architect. He designed several athletic stadiums, and is noted for his futuristic Sculptured House that was featured in the 1973 film Sleeper.  He is also noted as the designer of Kansas City's Arrowhead Stadium and Kauffman Stadium.

Biography
Deaton was born in Clayton, New Mexico and his family lived in a tent on the Oklahoma plains for two years.

Deaton studied structural engineering, industrial design and architecture on his own, and earned certification. He designed the futuristic Sculptured House on Genesee Mountain near Denver, Colorado that was featured in the Woody Allen movie Sleeper. He also designed a similar Key Savings and Loan Association (now Colonial Bank) building in Englewood, Colorado and the Wyoming National Bank in Casper, Wyoming.

In 1967, Kansas City, Missouri was planning to build a new multipurpose arena for its professional baseball and football teams. Deaton caught the ear of Kansas City Chiefs General Manager Jack Steadman and suggested building side-by-side stadiums for the two sports with each stadium customized to its needs. The entire complex would share parking facilities and highway infrastructure. Deaton's design for Arrowhead Stadium and Kauffman Stadium (known collectively as the Truman Sports Complex) was implemented by Kivett and Myers.

Deaton was also a notable board game designer who received three US Patents for that work. He applied for his first patent at age 19 for the board game Gusher, which was marketed by Carrom Industries of Michigan from 1940 through the early 1960s. Deaton received US Letters Patent 2,299,803 for Gusher in 1942.

Gusher is something of an improved version of Monopoly-style trading games, with oil wildcatting as its theme. The main improvement in this game is that the board itself actually helps influence the outcome of the game: the game board is shaken before playing commences, and pieces that are distributed internally then determine which" holes" are dry wells or gushers.

Deaton's other two patents also involve games which utilize interactive boards. He received US Letters Patent 2,295,452 in 1942 for Magnetic Minesweeper, marketed in 1941 by the Walco Bead Co. of New York City. He received US Letters Patent 4,078,805 in 1978 for Country Road.

Deaton also received additional patents for his various commercial designs, including furniture and interior lighting. He received his final US Letters Patent 4,688,357 in 1987 for a multi-use baseball/football sports stadium with movable seating.

In 1969, the Horatio Alger Association of Distinguished Americans honored Deaton by naming him to its membership.

Deaton died in Morrison, Colorado at the age of 75.

Gallery

References

External links
Colonial Bank Building in Colorado

1921 births
1996 deaths
People from Union County, New Mexico
Architects from New Mexico
20th-century American architects
People from Morrison, Colorado
Architects from Colorado
Sports venue architects